Sevenoaks School is a highly selective coeducational private school in Sevenoaks, Kent, England. It is the second oldest non-denominational school in the United Kingdom, dating back to 1432, only behind Oswestry (1407). Over 1,000 day pupils and boarders attend, ranging in age from 11 to 18 years. There are approximately equal numbers of boys and girls.  In 2006 it became the first major UK school to switch entirely from A level exams to the International Baccalaureate. The school is a former member of the G20 Schools group.

Sevenoaks School is among several leading UK schools that now charge annual boarding fees in excess of £42,000, making it one of the most expensive schools in the country. It is a registered charity.

Academic
(I)GCSE results: In 2015 over 94% of the GCSE, IGCSE and Sevenoaks School Certificate examinations taken by the 152 candidates were awarded A* or A grades. Over a third of the year-group gained ten A*s or more each, and 131 students gained 9 or more A* or A grades. All but seventeen results out of 1580 examinations were grade B or above. In Years 10 and 11, all students pursue the school's own certificated and UCAS-approved qualification in English Literature. 
IB results: In 2015 the average IB Diploma score at Sevenoaks School was 39.2 points (ten points above the world average). Thirteen students achieved the maximum 45 points, with 19 securing 44 points and another 22 securing 43 points. In 2017, the average IB score reached 40.6, with 24 students achieving 45 points. In 2019, the IB average score was 39.4, while 87% of pupils scored A*-A for their GCSEs.

Facilities

Three buildings were constructed for the school prior to the 20th century – Old School (formerly School House, which was built with the Almshouses in the early 18th century in the Palladian style and designed by Lord Burlington), the old Assembly Hall (1890) now part of the Swanzy Block, and the Cottage Block (late 19th century). Additional early buildings, previously private houses, include Park Grange (mid-19th century), Girls International House (1700), Claridge House (18th century), Manor House (late 18th century) and Temple House (1884).

In the April 2010, a new 13-million pound performing arts centre, The Space, was opened on the school campus. The Space was designed by Tim Ronalds Architects with Price & Myers acting as consulting engineers and has won several awards: the Commercial & Public Access category in the 2010 Wood Awards, Best Education Building in the 2010 Brick Awards, and an RIBA Award (South East Region) in 2011. It was also nominated for Best Public Building award of the 2012 Kent Design Awards.

History

Founded in 1432 by William Sevenoke as a part of his last will and testament, the school was intended to give a classical education to boys from the town, free of church constrictions. Sevenoke’s will also provided for almshouses for poor men and women. Sevenoaks School is one of the oldest lay foundations in England. Sevenoke was Mayor of London and, as a friend of Henry V, may have been influenced by the MP for Shropshire and King's pleader, David Holbache, who founded Oswestry in 1407. According to William Lambarde and Richard Johnson (Nine Worthies of London), Sevenoke was a foundling, whose decision to establish the school and almshouses may have been inspired by his early history.

In 1560, in response to a petition by Ralph Bosville and Sevenoaks parishioners, Elizabeth I issued letters patent incorporating the school, giving it the right to use her name, and changing its governance. A seal was issued bearing Bosville's initials and the motto Servire Deo Regnari Est. Ralph Bosville was Clerk of the Court of Wards and Liveries, a JP and owner of the Manor of Bradbourne near Sevenoaks, and under the conditions of the letters patent, he and his heirs were to serve on the governing body as long as they lived in Kent. He has been described as the school's 'second founder'. Supporting the letters patent, statues and ordinances were issued in 1574 and a private Act of Parliament passed in 1597. The school also received a number of bequests during the sixteenth century and during this period was brought to wider attention by William Lambarde's A Perambulation of Kent (1576).

The school is thought to have been initially housed in small buildings near the present site, before a school house was built. Rebuilding took place in 1631, under the supervision of Thomas Pett. It was again rebuilt in 1724, to the designs of Lord Burlington, a friend of the headmaster of the time, Elijah Fenton. Building work was completed in 1732. During this period the Master and scholars were housed outside the town.

The school remained small until the late 19th century. School records show that between 1716 and 1748, under the headmastership of the Revd Simpson, school numbers dropped from 'a great many scholars' to only four boys. Simpson resigned and was replaced by Edward Holme, a distant relative of Sir Richard Burton. By 1778 there were around 60 pupils, and the same is indicated in the School Inquiry Commission of 1868.

In 1884 the governors appointed Daniel Birkett as headmaster.  It was Birkett's vision to elevate the school's status to that of a First Grade Classical School.  He started this revolution, reducing the number of free places to the townfolk and expanding boarding.  When he resigned in the 1890s the school had over 100 boys.  Birkett's revolution was continued by George Heslop who increased the size to a peak of 134 boys, although numbers dropped towards the end of the First World War (during which 350 Old Sennockians enlisted). Geoffrey Garrod followed Heslop in 1919. In the same year, the headmaster's wife, Mrs Garrod, started a new school for younger boys; Sevenoaks Prep School started with six pupils in the school Cottage Block. An element of selection entered the admissions process in the early 1920s.

James Higgs-Walker succeeded Garrod in 1924.  Higgs-Walker, or "Jimmy" as he was known by the boys, started a revolution at the school with the introduction of day houses, the expansion of school sports and extracurricular activities and the vast expansion of the school with the help of the school's greatest benefactor since the founder, Charles Plumptre Johnson (or C.P.J.), who served as a governor from 1913 to 1923 and chairman from 1923 to his death in 1938.  Johnson donated many gifts to the school with his brother, Edward: *The Flagpole, 1924, *Thornhill, 1924 (Johnson's House), *Johnson's Hall, 1936 (Now Johnson's Library), *The Sanitorium, 1938, *Park Grange and the surrounding estate, 1946

Higgs-Walker led the school until 1956 when he was succeeded by Kim Taylor. Taylor's headship was something of a 'golden age', when the school became more prominent nationally through Taylor's introduction of a number of innovative teaching methodologies, "Mr. Taylor, the Headmaster, has built so successfully on the work of his predecessor that in the ten years he has been at Sevenoaks it has changed from an old-established minor public school ... into an experimental outpost of the Headmasters' Conference."

The school was a pioneer in the introduction of 'The New Maths', an approach to teaching the subject which made it less abstract, and more engaging for pupils. The school adopted the textbooks and examination regime of the School Mathematics Project (SMP) which had been pioneered at a number of other private schools.

The final period of every Wednesday was set aside for the sixth form to attend lectures, usually with a current affairs theme. Speakers have included public figures such as trade union leaders Ray Buckton (ASLEF) and Hugh Scanlon (AEU), boxer Henry Cooper, philosopher A. J. Ayer and astronomer Patrick Moore.

In 1968, Taylor was succeeded by Michael Hinton who was himself succeeded by Alan Tammadge in 1971.

In 1976, the school first admitted girls and moved from being a single-sex school to a co-educational one.

In 2012, the independent review of A level and IB results, based on government issued statistics, ranked Sevenoaks School first in the UK, ahead of Westminster (17th), St Paul's (22nd), Harrow (34th), Winchester (73rd) and Eton (80th).

Controversies

Fee-fixing cartel

Between 2001 and 2004, Sevenoaks School orchestrated the Independent school fee fixing scandal, a fee-fixing cartel involving fifty prominent independent schools in the United Kingdom. It was subsequently found guilty of operating a fee-fixing cartel by the Office of Fair Trading. The Independent Schools Council – a lobby group funded by the independent schools in question – said that the investigation had been "a scandalous waste of public money".

Inflation of predicted grades

In June 2020, The Guardian reported that, as formally codified as a school policy in the staff handbook, Sevenoaks School had for 'many years' exaggerated the predicted exam results of '1 in 12' of its students (20 per year).

This policy was outlined in full in July 2020 by The Daily Telegraph, which revealed that 'in around 20 cases a year' the school inflated predicted grades 'to facilitate the application' of the student to university. Mary Curnock Cook commented that it was 'embarrassing for Sevenoaks that deliberately overpredicting students’ grades is in writing in their guidelines'.

The Charity Commission stated that it had engaged with the school over 'a broad set of concerns including predictions' and 'governance concerns', with which investigation the school said it was 'cooperating fully'. UCAS confirmed that it had already sent the school a reminder of its guidelines, and the Department for Education warned that 'Schools should not be inflating predicted grades'. The school 'refuted any suggestion that we would unfairly exaggerate UCAS predictions' and then announced that it would edit the staff handbook to 'ensure there is no confusion'. Furthermore, after initially stating that its accuracy in predicting grades 'significantly outperformed the national average', the school clarified that its predictions did not outperform the national average. The International Baccalaureate stated that the last five years of predictions were 'in line with' results. Robert Sackville-West, 7th Baron Sackville, who sits on the UK board of the International Baccalaureate, was Chair of Trustees at the school from 2002 until 2008, and since 2012 has been Chair of the Trustees of the Sevenoaks School Foundation, a charity that acts as the fundraising arm of the school.

On 25 June 2020, Shadow Education Secretary Mike Watson, Baron Watson of Invergowrie posed a written question to the Conservative Party in the House of Lords, asking 'what discussions they have had with Sevenoaks School'. Elizabeth Berridge, Baroness Berridge, Parliamentary Under-Secretary of the Department for Education, replied that 'the school has been reminded about [UCAS] guidelines' and that 'Schools should not be inflating predicted grades.'

In literature 
 Sevenoaks schoolmaster William Painter introduced his translation of William Fulke's Antiprognosticon (1560) with a letter written from Sevenoaks.
 The finding of William Sevenoke is described by William Lambarde in A Perambulation of Kent (1576).
 William Camden mentions the school and almshouses in Britannia (1586).
 A school tradition, cited in the prospectus and school history, maintains that Sevenoaks is the 'grammar school' of Jack Cade's speech in Henry VI Part 2, Act 4, scene 7. Jonathan Bate would appear to support this (The Genius of Shakespeare, 1997).
 William Sevenoke is one of Richard Johnson's Nine Worthies of London (1592).
 John Stow refers to William Sevenoke's civic roles and the founding of the school and almshouses in his Survey of London (1603), as does Anthony Munday in A Brief Chronicle (1611).
 Daniel Defoe refers to the school in A tour through the whole island of Great Britain (1724–27).
 John Wesley preached 'at an open place near the Free-School', on Saturday, 4 October 1746. (Journal of the Rev John Wesley)
 Maurice Henry Hewlett reflects on friendships of his schooldays in Lore of Proserpine (1913).
 The Sevenoaks education of Huang Ya Dong (Wang Y Tong) and the son of John Frederick Sackville and Giovanna Baccelli is mentioned in Vita Sackville-West's Knole and the Sackvilles (1922).
 Charlie Higson's fictional boarding school, Rowhurst (The Dead, 2010) was inspired by Sevenoaks.
 In Ian McEwan's novel Sweet Tooth (2012), the character Tom Haley is described as 'the product of a good grammar school, Sevenoaks'.

Notable students and alumni 

Former pupils are known as "Old Sennockians".

Academics and scientists 
 Sir Jonathan Bate CBE, FBA, FRSL, academic, biographer and critic
 Mark Brouard, professor of chemistry
Simon Donaldson, mathematician
 Francis Everitt, professor of physics, Stanford University
Emily Greenwood, professor of Classics and the University Center for Human Values
George Grote, historian
David Kear (geologist), geologist
 Noel Kingsbury, writer on gardening and plant science
Paddy Lowe, motor racing engineer
Tom McLeish FRS, FRSC, theoretical physicist
 Philip Ruffles CBE, FREng, FRS, aerospace engineer, former Director of Engineering and Technology of Rolls-Royce plc
 Max Saunders, academic specialising in modern literature and culture
Jonael Schickler, philosopher
 Oliver Taplin, professor
 Nigel Warburton, philosopher
Nick Wirth, automotive engineer and former owner of the Simtek Formula One team

Activists, diplomats and politicians 
 Jonathan Evans, Baron Evans of Weardale KCB, DL, former Director General of MI5
 Stephen Hale OBE, Chief Executive of Refugee Action
 Michael Holmes, former leader of UK Independence Party
 Raşit Pertev, Turkish Cypriot development practitioner, politician and writer
Colwyn Philipps, 3rd Viscount St Davids, British peer, Conservative Party politician and Deputy Speaker of the House of Lords
 Christopher Prout, Baron Kingsland, British barrister and Conservative Party politician
 Sir Jonathan Stephens KCB, civil servant
 Tristram Stuart, author and campaigner
Ben Summerskill, lobbyist, Director of the Criminal Justice Alliance
 Peter Thomson (diplomat), former President of the United Nations General Assembly
 Colin Vereker, 8th Viscount Gort, Irish peer and member of the House of Keys
 Caroline Wilson (diplomat), British Ambassador to China

Arts and entertainment 
Tanis, singer songwriter and composer
Stuart Clark, Radio Caroline DJ
Adam Curtis, filmmaker
Daniel Day-Lewis, actor
Clive Dunn, actor
 Clive Farahar, antiquarian book specialist, dealer, expert on the BBC's Antiques Roadshow
 Daniel Flynn (actor), actor
 Andy Gill, musician
 Brett Goldstein, actor, comedian, writer
 Andrew Gourlay, conductor
 Tom Greenhalgh, musician (Mekons)
Paul Greengrass, director and filmmaker
 Emma Johnson, clarinetist
 Jon King, musician
 James McVinnie, organist and pianist
Joe Stilgoe, singer, pianist and songwriter
Geoffrey Streatfeild, actor
 The Webb Sisters, Charley and Hattie Webb, musicians
 Helen Zaltzman, broadcaster and writer

Artists and designers 
 Charles Barry Jr., architect
 Will Burrard-Lucas, wildlife photographer
 Lucy Cousins, illustrator and author
 Thomas Heatherwick, designer
 Emma Hope, British shoe designer 
 Simon Starling, winner of the 2005 Turner Prize

Business 
Parth Jindal, Managing Director of JSW Cement and JSW Paints
 Vikas Kapoor, CEO of Mezocliq
 Jill McDonald, CEO of Costa Coffee and former CEO of Halfords

Church leaders 
 Thomas Comber, Dean of Durham
 John Frith, martyr and translator of the New Testament
 Charles Wordsworth, churchman, scholar and schoolmaster
 Edward Perronet, hymn-writer, itinerant Wesleyan preacher
 Alan Wilson (bishop), Bishop of Buckingham
 Clive Gregory, Bishop of Wolverhampton

Journalists, writers and publishers 
 Paul Adams, journalist
 Mick Audsley, film editor
John Bowdler the Younger, essayist, poet and lawyer
 Olivia Cole (poet), journalist and poet
 Sarah Harrison, investigative journalist, staff member of WikiLeaks
Maurice Henry Hewlett, author
Charlie Higson, comedian and author
Sonny Mehta, editor, former head of Alfred A Knopf
 Plum Sykes, author
 Elleston Trevor, author and playwright

Military 
 Henry Hardinge, 1st Viscount Hardinge, field marshal and statesman
 Patrick Heenan, Captain in the British Indian Army who was convicted of treason and executed after spying for Japan during the Malayan campaign of World War II
 Martin Smith (Royal Marines officer), former Commandant General Royal Marines
 Charles Stickland CB, OBE, former Commandant General Royal Marines
 Vice Admiral Gordon McLintock (USMS), the 4th and longest serving superintendent of the United States Merchant Marine Academy

Royalty 
Sir Timothy Laurence, vice admiral and husband of Princess Anne, The Princess Royal
Prince Amedeo of Belgium, Archduke of Austria-Este, grandson of King Albert II of Belgium and nephew to Philippe King of the Belgians
Princess Luisa Maria of Belgium, Archduchess of Austria-Este, granddaughter of King Albert II of Belgium and niece to Philippe King of the Belgians
Princess Elisabeth von Thurn und Taxis, daughter of Johannes, 11th Prince of Thurn and Taxis

Sports 
 Christina Bassadone, Olympic sailor
Daniel Caprice, rugby union player
Paul Downton, cricketer
 Tash Farrant, cricketer
James Graham-Brown, cricketer
Tony Roques, Rugby union player
 Robby Swift, windsurfer
Chris Tavaré, cricketer (ex biology teacher at the school)
Andy Titterrell, rugby union player
Ian Walker, Olympic sailor

Other 
 Huang Ya Dong, early Chinese visitor to England
C.W.R. Knight, MC, British falconer and writer
Emma Slade, charity founder, Buddhist nun and writer

Former staff

Jonty Driver (English teacher 1964-5, Housemaster of the International Sixth Form Centre 1967-73), writer, who wrote a book about his experiences at the school
Elijah Fenton, poet, biographer, translator and schoolmaster of Sevenoaks School
Don Foster, Baron Foster of Bath, British politician
Chris Greenhalgh, writer
James Higgs-Walker, cricketer and headmaster of Sevenoaks School
Alan Hurd, cricketer
James Jones (bishop), former Bishop of Liverpool
Chris Tavaré, retired English international cricketer
Kim Taylor (educationalist), educationalist and headmaster of Sevenoaks School
Ernie Toser, English professional footballer

References

External links
Sevenoaks School website
Sevenoaks School on Ofsted.
Profile at the Good Schools Guide
William Sevenoke, The History of Parliament

Private schools in Kent
International Baccalaureate schools in England
1432 establishments in England
Educational institutions established in the 15th century
Member schools of the Headmasters' and Headmistresses' Conference
 
Schools in Sevenoaks